Tamires Crude (born 12 January 1994) is a Brazilian judoka.

She won a medal at the 2019 World Judo Championships.

References

External links
 

1994 births
Living people
Brazilian female judoka
21st-century Brazilian women
20th-century Brazilian women